The Battle of Onjong, also known as the Battle of Wenjing, was one of the first engagements between Chinese and South Korean forces during the Korean War. It took place around Onjong in present-day North Korea from 25 to 29 October 1950. As the main focus of the Chinese First Phase Offensive, the People's Volunteer Army (PVA) 40th Corps conducted a series of ambushes against the Republic of Korea Army (ROK) II Corps, effectively destroying the right flank of the United States Eighth Army while stopping the UN advance north toward the Yalu River.

Background

The Korean War began on 25 June 1950 when the North Korean Korean People's Army (KPA) attacked South Korea. The invasion was almost successful in conquering all of South Korea until the UN intervened, sending ground forces into the country under the command of the United States. The UN forces initially experienced early defeats until the Battle of the Pusan Perimeter, where the UN forces reversed the KPA's momentum. By October 1950, the KPA was effectively destroyed by the UN forces after the landing at Inchon, the breakout from the Pusan Perimeter and the UN September 1950 counteroffensive. Despite the strong objections from the People's Republic of China on North Korea's northern border, the US Eighth Army crossed the 38th Parallel and advanced towards the Sino-Korean border at the Yalu River. As part of the offensive to end the war, ROK II Corps, comprising the ROK 6th, 7th and 8th Infantry Divisions, was ordered to attack north towards the Yalu River through the village of Onjong on 23 October 1950.

In response to the UN advances, Chinese Communist Party chairman Mao Zedong, ordered the People's Liberation Army's North East Frontier Force to enter North Korea and engage UN forces under the name People's Volunteer Army (PVA). In order to stabilize the rapidly collapsing Korean front and to push back the advancing UN forces, Mao authorized the First Phase Campaign, a bridgehead-building operation with the aim of destroying the ROK II Corps, the vanguard and the right flank of the US Eighth Army, advancing up along the Taebaek Mountains in the middle of the peninsula. After the Chinese leadership finally settled the issue of armed intervention on October 18, Mao ordered the PVA to enter Korea on 19 October under strict secrecy.

Prelude

Locations and terrain
At the east of Onjong stands the town of Huich'on, the staging area of the ROK II Corps for the offensive. Because of the hilly terrain at the Sino-Korean Border, Onjong is one of the few access points into the Yalu River area. The terrain also limits troop movements while providing ideal grounds for ambushes.

Forces and strategy
On 24 October the ROK 6th Infantry Division of II Corps advanced westward from Huich'on, and Onjong was captured on the same day. From Onjong, the ROK 7th Infantry Regiment, 6th Infantry Division turned north and advanced towards Kojang, while the ROK 2nd Infantry Regiment, 6th Infantry Division planned to advance northwest from Onjong towards Pukchin. Because the UN Command expected no opposition from the destroyed KPA, the advances were not coordinated between the UN units. As a result, the ROK 7th Infantry Regiment managed to wander into enemy territory without much opposition, completely oblivious to the new threats surrounding them.

While the ROK were advancing towards the Yalu River, the PVA were also trying to deploy their units for the upcoming First Phase Campaign. As the PVA Commander Peng Dehuai scrambled to set up his new command post at Taeyudong, the planned advance by the ROK 2nd Infantry Regiment threatened to overrun his position. Without any KPA units nearby to hide the presence of the PVA, Peng was forced to start the First Phase Campaign early by moving the PVA 40th Corps to intercept the ROK 2nd Infantry Regiment near Onjong. On the night of 24 October the PVA 118th Division of 40th Corps arrived at its designated blocking position. Meanwhile, the PVA had set up numerous ambush positions on the ridges overlooking the Onjong-Pukchin road.

Battle

Initial contacts
On the morning of 25 October and with its 3rd Battalion on point, the ROK 2nd Infantry Regiment started to advance northwest towards Pukchin. The ROK soon came under fire  to the west of Onjong. The 3rd Battalion dismounted from their vehicles to disperse what they thought would be a small force of KPA, but the two PVA regiments on the high ground immediately began pouring heavy fire onto the ROK left, front and right flanks. The 3rd Battalion broke instantly, abandoning most of its vehicles and artillery along the way. About 400 survivors managed to escape the trap and fall back into Onjong.

When the ROK 2nd Infantry Regiment learned that the 3rd Battalion was under heavy attack, its 2nd Battalion was moved forward to support the 3rd Battalion while its 1st Battalion was sent back to Onjong. Although the 2nd Battalion was turned back after encountering strong resistances, the ROK managed to capture several Chinese prisoners who revealed that there were nearly 10,000 Chinese soldiers waiting down the road. At the same time, the PVA High Command ordered the PVA 120th Division of 40th Corps to join the battle while the rest of the 40th Corps was busy setting up roadblocks around Onjong. With all the roadblocks in place by midnight, the PVA 118th Division and one regiment from the PVA 120th Division attacked Onjong on 26 October at 03:30, and the ROK 2nd Infantry Regiment was dispersed within 30 minutes. At this point not a single company of the regiment was left intact, and the ROK 2nd Infantry Regiment ceased to be an organized unit. Approximately 2,700 men of the 3,100 in the regiment eventually escaped to the Ch'ongch'on River. Two US Army Korean Military Advisory Group (KMAG) advisors were also captured.

Second ambush
The loss of surprise due to the early start of the First Phase Campaign greatly disappointed Mao. Nevertheless, Mao still urged Peng to destroy the ROK by baiting them with trapped units. At the same time, Major General Yu Jae-hung, commander of ROK II Corps, sent the ROK 19th Infantry Regiment, 6th Infantry Division (under Colonel Park Kwang Hyuk) and the ROK 10th Infantry Regiment, 8th Infantry Division (under Colonel Go Geun Hong) to recapture Onjong and to salvage the lost equipment from the battle. The ROK 7th Infantry Regiment, under the command of Colonel Im Pu Taek, was also ordered to retreat south with the ROK 6th Infantry Division. Hoping to draw the rest of ROK II Corps into the open, Peng ordered the PVA 118th Division to swing north and to trap the retreating ROK 7th Infantry Regiment, while the PVA 119th and 120th Divisions would wait to ambush any rescue forces passing through Onjong. On October 27, the PVA 118th Division isolated the ROK 7th Infantry Regiment by cutting the road between Kojang and Onjong, but the ROK 7th Infantry Regiment did not reach the roadblock due to the lack of fuel. Upon realizing that ROK II Corps had not fallen for the deception, Peng ordered the 119th and the 120th Divisions to destroy the ROK 10th and 19th Infantry Regiments. On the night of 28 October, the ambush by the two PVA divisions quickly decimated the advancing ROK regiments at the east of Onjong, and the PVA roadblocks in the rear areas forced the ROK soldiers to abandon all vehicles and artillery in order to escape.

The PVA 118th Division was ordered to wait for reinforcements from the 50th Corps, but the 118th Division attacked alone on the night of 29 October to prevent the ROK from escaping. After a two-hour battle, the ROK 7th Infantry Regiment was forced to disperse with its survivors scattered into the hills. About 875 officers and 3,552 other soldiers managed to escape, while Major Harry Fleming of the Korean Military Advisory Group was wounded fifteen times and was later captured by the PVA.

Aftermath
With the loss of the ROK 6th Infantry Division and the ROK 10th Infantry Regiment, ROK II Corps was devastated, and effectively ceased to be an organized fighting force. This meant the right flank of the US Eighth Army was completely open to the PVA, which were now advancing south to overwhelm the UN forces. Exploiting the situation, the PVA launched another attack on the now exposed Eighth Army center, resulting in the loss of the ROK 15th Infantry Regiment and the US 8th Cavalry Regiment at the Battle of Unsan. With the PVA pouring into the rear of the UN lines, the Eighth Army was forced to retreat to the Ch'ongch'on River. Only the stubborn defense of Kunu-ri by the US 5th Regimental Combat Team and the ROK 7th Infantry Division on 4 November managed to stop the PVA advance and prevented a disastrous defeat for the Eighth Army. By 5 November logistics difficulties forced the PVA to end the First Phase Campaign.

Although the PVA were unable to exploit the breakthrough in the UN lines, the weakness of ROK II Corps on the Eighth Army's right flank was exposed to the PVA commanders. During the planning of the PVA Second Phase Offensive, Peng would again focus his attention towards ROK II Corps at the Eighth Army's right flank, resulting in a disastrous defeat for the UN forces at the Battle of the Ch'ongch'on River. To commemorate this battle as China's official entry into the Korean War, 25 October is currently the War to Resist America and Aid Korea Memorial Day in China.

Notes
Footnotes

Citations

References

Battles of the Korean War
Battles of the Korean War involving China
October 1950 events in Asia
China–South Korea military relations
Battles and operations of the Korean War in 1950  
Battles of the Korean War involving South Korea 
Battles of the Korean War involving North Korea
History of North Pyongan Province